The B. Verkin Institute for Low Temperature Physics and Engineering is a research institute that conducts basic research in experimental and theoretical physics, mathematics, as well as in the field of applied physics. It was founded in 1960 by Borys Verkin, Oleksandr Galkin, Borys. Eselson and Ihor Dmytrenko. The first director was Borys Verkin.

Main areas of research are high-temperature superconductivity, weak superconductivity, magneto antiferromagnets, physics of low-dimensional systems, point-contact spectroscopy, quantum crystals, nonlinear phenomena in metals, physics of disordered systems, quantum phenomena in plasticity and others. The institute has published about 250 monographs, textbooks, reference books, more than 12,000 articles and reviews in ranking scientific journals, and has trained more than 850 highly qualified experts — PhDs.

History
On May 13, 1960 the presidium of the National Academy of Sciences of Ukraine issued a decision to establish the Kharkiv Physics and Technical Institute for Low Temperatures on the initiative of several scientists from the Ukrainian Institute of Physics and Technology.

The institute was created by nine laboratories involved in low temperature physics. Four math departments were also established. In 1987 they were organized into the ILTPE Mathematics Department.

In 1991 ILTPE was named after its founder — B. Verkin.

Directors

 1960 — 1988 Borys Verkin
 1988 — 1991 Anatolii Zvyagin
 1991 — 2006 Viktor Yeremenko
 2006 — 2020 Serhiy Hnatchenko
2021 - Yurii Naidyuk

Structure

Physics departments
 Department of Magnetism
 Department of Optical and Magnetic Properties of Solids
 Department of Magnetic  and Elastic Properties of  Solids
 Department of Transport Properties of Conducting and Superconducting Systems
 Department of Physics of Real Crystals
 Department of Thermal Properties and Structure of Solids and Nanosystems
 Department of Physics of Quantum Fluids and Crystals
 Department of Spectroscopy of Molecular Systems and Nanostructured Materials
 Department of Superconducting and Mesoscopic Structures
 Department of Molecular Biophysics
 Department of Point-Contact Spectroscopy
 Department of Theoretical Physics

Mathematics departments
 Department of Mathematical Physics
 Department of Differential Equations and Geometry
 Department of Statistical Methods in Mathematical Physics
 Department of Function Theory

Scientific & Technical departments
 Department of Information Systems
 Department of low-temperatures and space materials

Publications
ILTPE publishes two scientific journals included on a list of leading peer-reviewed scientific journals and publications:
 Low Temperature Physics, published since January 1975 in Russian, as well as the American Institute of Physics in English under the title Low Temperature Physics 1997. Published monthly. The magazine has Ukraine's highest impact factor of scientific journals.
 Journal of Mathematical Physics, Analysis, Geometry, published since 2005. Published quarterly in English. ("Journal of Mathematical Physics, Analysis, Geometry" was founded in 1994. Formerly "Matematicheskaya Fizika, Analiz, Geometriya" until July 2005)

References

External links
 Official Site

Institutes of the National Academy of Sciences of Ukraine
NASU department of physics and astronomy
Research institutes in Kharkiv
Science and technology in Ukraine
Scientific organizations based in Ukraine
Research institutes in the Soviet Union
Physics institutes
Research institutes established in 1960
1960 establishments in the Soviet Union